Denis Blackham (born in 1952) is an English music mastering engineer. He began his audio mastering work in 1969 at IBC Studios in London, and later worked for Polygram, RCA, The Master Room, Nimbus Records, Tape One and Porky's. In 1996 he set up his own studio at his home in Surrey, England and when he moved to the Isle of Skye in 2002, he changed the name of his studio to Skye Mastering. In February 2022, Denis and Rose left Skye and relocated to southern Thailand.

Denis has mastered recordings by: the Unthanks, Charlie Dore, and many more in his 50 plus years of music mastering. Blackham semi-retired on 5 May 2014.

Blackham's courtship of his wife is the subject of a song by Charlie Dore on her 2017 album Dark Matter.

References

External links
 Skye Mastering

1952 births
Living people
English audio engineers

Mastering engineers